Edward James Bruce, 10th Earl of Elgin, 14th Earl of Kincardine KT, CMG, TD, CD, JP (9 June 1881 – 27 November 1968) was the son of Victor Bruce, 9th Earl of Elgin who became Assistant Private Secretary to the Secretary State for the Colonies (1908–11) and a director of the Royal Bank of Scotland.

He had been a Captain in the Forfar and Kincardine Royal Garrison Artillery Militia, and when the Territorial Force was created in 1908 he became Commanding officer of the Highland (Fifeshire) Heavy Battery, RGA with the rank of Major, a position that he held at the outbreak of World War I. He served in the war, attaining the rank of Lieutenant-Colonel, and being mentioned in dispatches twice. In 1918–19 he was Assistant Director of Labour and a Temporary Colonel and Labour Commandant. After the war he received the CMG.

On 5 January 1921, he married Katherine Cochrane, daughter of Lt.-Col. Thomas Cochrane, 1st Baron Cochrane of Cults and Lady Gertrude Boyle. In 1938, his wife was appointed Dame Commander of the Order of the British Empire (DBE).

The couple had six children:
 Lady Martha Veronica Bruce OBE (7 November 1921 – 22 January 2023), who became governor of Greenock and Cornton Vale prisons
 Lady Jean Christian Bruce (born 12 January 1923)
 Andrew Bruce, 11th Earl of Elgin (born 17 February 1924)
 Hon. James Michael Edward Bruce (26 August 1927 – 22 April 2013) 
 Lady Alison Margaret Bruce (born 17 October 1931)
 Hon. Edward David Bruce (born 29 February 1936)

He was made a Knight of the Thistle (Scotland's premier order of chivalry) on 3 June 1933. He also held the Order of Polonia Restituta.

After the formation of the Scottish Home Guard in January 1941, Bruce was made commander of No. 3 Zone (Fife & Kinross-shire), South Highland Area.  He held this appointment until the end of the war.

As a Colonel in the Territorial Reserve the Earl held a number of honorary colonelcies in the Territorial Army and Canadian Militia:
 City of Edinburgh (Fortress) Royal Engineers (TA).
 Elgin Regiment (RCAC), Canadian Permanent Militia, appointed 23 November 1938.
 71st (Forth) Heavy Anti-Aircraft Regiment, Royal Artillery (TA) and its successor, the 371st (Mixed) Heavy Anti-Aircraft Regiment (Forth), RA (TA), appointed 28 January 1939.
 357th Medium Regiment (Lothians), RA (TA)
 No 948 Balloon Squadron, Royal Auxiliary Air Force (Honorary Air Commodore)

On October 29, 1958 during the Dedication of the California Masonic Memorial Temple at 1111 California Street in San Francisco, Lord Elgin, then senior past grand master of the Grand Lodge of Scotland presented on its behalf a gift of a beautiful marshal's baton made of Scottish Oak to the Grand Lodge of California F.&A.M..  California Grand Marshal John T. Bond used this baton for the first time to escort Lord Elgin back to his seat. That same baton has been used each year by successive Grand Marshals to lead the ceremonial opening of the Grand Lodge of California in front of over a thousand attendees.  California Grand Marshals each year are also given exact reproductions of the baton, for use at functions outside the Grand Lodge building and as a memento of their service, along with a history and symbolism of Lord Elgin's presentation.

He was also Lieutenant of the Royal Company of Archers the Queen's Bodyguard for Scotland.

In 1964, he commissioned a statue of Robert the Bruce.

He died at the age of 87 in 1968.

References

External links

1881 births
1968 deaths
Alumni of Balliol College, Oxford
British Army personnel of World War I
Companions of the Order of St Michael and St George
Deputy Lieutenants of Fife
10
14
Knights of the Thistle
Lord-Lieutenants of Fife
Members of the Royal Company of Archers
People educated at Eton College
Recipients of the Order of Polonia Restituta
Royal Garrison Artillery officers
Edward